Kai Li (born 1954) is a Chinese-American computer scientist and professor of Princeton University. He is noted for his work on Distributed Shared Memory (DSM)  and co-founding the storage deduplication company Data Domain Inc. which was acquired by EMC Corporation in 2009.

In 2012, Li was elected as a member into the National Academy of Engineering for advances in data storage and distributed computer systems.

Background
Kai received his Ph.D. degree from Yale University in 1986 and then joined Princeton University. Prior to that, he received his B.S. degree from Jilin University and M.S. degree from University of Science and Technology of China.

Academic contribution
In 1986, Kai Li published his PhD dissertation entitled "Shared Virtual Memory on Loosely Coupled Microprocessors", thus opening up the field of research that is now known as distributed shared memory (DSM) which allows users to program using a shared-memory programming model on clusters. Since this work, there has been a huge amount of work done to extend the idea to other areas (e.g., distributed object based systems and operating systems) and to improve DSM's performance. After joining Princeton, Li himself also led the Scalable High-performance Really Inexpensive MultiProcessor (SHRIMP) project, which investigated how to build high-performance servers on a cluster.

During his Princeton career, Kai co-led the Scalable I/O project which attacked I/O bottleneck problems for supercomputers. His work with protected user-level communication has contributed significantly to the Remote Direct Memory Access (RDMA) mechanism, the Virtual Interface Architecture standard, and the Infiniband standard, which are the communication mechanisms for the Direct Access File System (DAFS).

Kai also led the Scalable Display Wall project, which explores how to build and use a high-resolution, wall-size display system to visualize massive datasets. Recently, he has been working with colleagues at Stanford on a large well-labelled image dataset called ImageNet to help computer vision community develop object recognition and classification methods for large image data.  More recently, he has been working with colleagues at Princeton on developing methods to efficiently manage and analyze the vast amount of data generated by increasingly sophisticated research in fields ranging from genomics to neuroscience.

His google scholar statistic shows his prime contributions in virtual memory and data storage.

Entrepreneur experience
During his sabbatical from Princeton in 2001, with Brian Biles, Kai co-founded Data Domain Corporation which built the first commercial deduplication storage system, opening up a new billion-dollar market. In June 2009, EMC Corporation acquired Data Domain for $2.4 billion, outbidding NetApp's previous offer.  In 2010, Data Domain product line captured 64.2% share of the market for purpose-built backup devices worldwide, including mainframes.

In Data Domain, he served as initial chief executive officer (CEO) and then chief technology officer (CTO) from October 2001 to August 2002. Since September 2002, he served as its chief scientist.

Prior to joining Data Domain, he served as an industry consultant of AT&T, Bell Labs, Digital Equipment Corporation, Intel, and NEC. He served as a director of Pattern Insight Inc. and served as advisory board members of EMC Corporation, Inphi Corporation, Intel research labs, and Open Innovation Center of Samsung Corporation.

Since 2016, he served on the board of directors for Moqi, a venture-backed company which produces a fingerprint matching system employing image search algorithms, with broad applications in law enforcement, government, healthcare and financial industries.

Awards
He was elected as an Association for Computing Machinery (ACM) fellow and Institute of Electrical and Electronics Engineers (IEEE) fellow in 1998 and 2011, respectively. In 2012 he was elected to the National Academy of Engineering. He received Overseas Outstanding Contribution Award, China Computer Federation in 2008. He was elected a foreign member of the Chinese Academy of Engineering in 2017.

References

External links
 Official website

1954 births
Living people
Computer science educators
Princeton University faculty
Yale University alumni
Chinese emigrants to the United States
Members of the United States National Academy of Engineering
Foreign members of the Chinese Academy of Engineering
Chinese computer scientists
American computer scientists
American technology company founders
Jilin University alumni
University of Science and Technology of China alumni